Dovania poecila is a moth of the family Sphingidae. It is known from forests (usually above 4,000 feet) in Kenya, Uganda, Rwanda, Burundi, Tanzania and Malawi.

The length of the forewings is 30–35 mm. The head and body are blackish, woolly, with a series of white transverse bands interrupted at the dorsum on the abdomen. The forewings are very dark purplish brown with faint, irregular paler transverse bands, a small white stigma and two prominent white lines at the apex. The hindwings are bright coppery, but blackish near the inner margin.

The larvae feed on Acanthus pubescens.

References

Sphingini
Moths described in 1903
Moths of Africa
Taxa named by Walter Rothschild
Taxa named by Karl Jordan